Francis Haar born as Haár Ferenc (July 19, 1908 – December 22, 1997) was a Hungarian socio-photographer. He studied interior architecture at Hungarian Royal National School of Arts and Crafts between 1924 and 1927. His master was Gyula Kaesz.

Life and career
He started working as an interior architect and poster designer in 1928, and taught himself photography. In 1930 he became acquainted with Munka-kör (Work Circle) led by socialist avant-garde poet and visual artist Lajos Kassák, who just returned from Vienna. Kassák pointed out that photography is more than painting and can access such a part of reality that cannot be accessed by painters. Kassák's motto was photography is the real child of our age, not the painting. That was a lifelong inspiration to Francis. He became an active and leading member of the Munka Kör, his partners in socio-photography were among others Sándor Gönci, Árpád Szélpál and Lajos Lengyel, who later became renowned graphic artist and book designer. The first socio photo exhibition ever in Hungary was held in 1932, which brought the first success to Francis. His first photo studio was opened in Budapest in 1934.

Some of his photos were exhibited at the Paris Exposition Internationale des Arts et Techniques dans la Vie Moderne in 1937, so Francis Haar decided to move to Paris where he established himself as a portrait photographer.

However, in 1939 he was invited by Hiroshi Kawazoe to Japan and the International Cultural Society of Japan (Kokusai Bunka Shinkokai) officially arranged his trip. With help of Japanese friends he opened and operated his photo studio in Tokyo between 1940 and 42. The Haar family was evacuated to Karuizawa in 1943 and they spent 3 years there. He became the photographer of Yank, the Army Weekly magazine of the U.S. occupation forces in Japan, and subsequently filmmaker with U.S. Public Health and Welfare Section (1946–48). Again his Tokyo photo studio was opened in 1946 and was in active business until 1956. His wife Irene opened the famous restaurant  Irene's Hungaria in Ginza, downtown Tokyo, which was frequented by celebrities, intellectuals, army men and sportspeople from all over the world besides the Japanese.

Accepting a challenge he moved and worked as a photographer for the Container Corporation of America, Chicago from 1956 until 1959. He returned to Tokyo and operated his photo studio again for a year. 
1960 brought a great decision and the Haars moved to Hawai'i and Francis started his photo studio there. He taught photography at the University of Hawai'i between 1964 and 1974. He became the production photographer for the Kennedy Theater, the University of Hawai'i Drama Department.

Francis Haar died at the age of 89 in Honolulu.

References
 Francis Haar – A Lifetime of Images (edited by Tom Haar). University of Hawaii Press, 2001. 
 Haár Ferenc in Hungarian

Awards
 1933, 1935 First Prize, National Photo Contest, Budapest
 1959 First Prize, Metropolitan Improvement Photo Contest, Chicago
 Golden Eagle Award for Pineapple Country Hawai'i, C.I.N.E., Washington D.C.
 Photographic Award, Educational Perspectives Magazine, University of Hawai'i
 Gift Print Award, Arts Council of Hawai'i
 Living Treasure of Hawai'i, Honpa Hongwanji and the Hawai'i State Legislature
 Lifetime Achievement Award, Hungarian Photographic Society

Books
 Way to Orient Arts Publishing Company, Tokyo, 1940
 Hungarian Picture Book Benrido Publishing Company, Kyoto, 1941
 Around Mount Fuji Benrido Publishing Company, Kyoto, 1942
 The Best of Old Japan Charles Tuttle Company, Tokyo, 1951
 Japanese Theatre in Highlights Charles Tuttle Company, Tokyo, 1951
 Mermaids of Japan Kanabeshobo Company, Tokyo, 1954
 Geisha of Pontocho by P.D. Perkins. Photographs by Francis Haar. Tokyo News Service, 1954
 The World of Dew : aspects of living Japan by D.J. Enright. Photographs by Francis Haar. Secker & Warburg, 1955
 Tokyo You Should See Charles Tuttle Company, Tokyo, 1960
 Foto Haár Ferenc Corvina Publishing Company, Budapest, 1969
 Legends of Hawai'i Victoria Publishers, Honolulu, 1972
 Artists of Hawai'i Vol. 1 University of Hawai'i Press, Honolulu, 1974
 Artists of Hawai'i Vol. 2 University of Hawai'i Press, Honolulu, 1977
 Iolani Luahine Topgallant Publishing, Honolulu, 1985, 
 A Zen Life: D. T. Suzuki Remembered (edited by Masao Abe) Paperback, Weatherhill, 1986,  
 Francis Haar: A Lifetime of Images (edited by Tom Haar) Hardback, University of Hawaii Press, 2001,  
 Haár Ferenc Magyarországi Képei: út a Munka-Körtől a Zen-Buddhizmusig (co-authors: Magdolna Kolta and Ferenc Király), Magyar Fotográfiai Múzeum, Kecskemét, 2004

Exhibitions
 1940, 1941 • Shirokiya Department Store Gallery, Tokyo
 1949 • American Cultural Center, Tokyo
 1952 • Haar Photo Studio, Kamakura, Japan 
 1957 • Chicago Public Library
 1958 • University of Chicago
 1962 • Honolulu Public Library
 1963 • Art Department University of Hawai'i
 1968 • Unitarian Church Gallery, Honolulu
 1969 • Graphic Gallery, Honolulu Academy of Arts
 1972 • Helikon Galéria, Budapest 
 1972 • Princess Kaiulani Hotel, Honolulu
 1973 • American Savings and Loan Art Gallery, Honolulu
 1975 • Kennedy Theatre, University of Hawai'i
 1983 • Focus Gallery, Honolulu Academy of Arts
 1989 • Fotóművészeti Galéria, Budapest
 1990 • Graphics Gallery, Honolulu Academy of Arts
 1991 • Budapest Galéria, Budapest
 1991 • Gallery Saka, Tokyo
 2003 • Retrospective – Hungarian Museum of Photography, Kecskemét
 2004 • Photos of Francis Haar, 1930–1980, Kassák Museum, Budapest
 2009 • Haár Ferenc & Mineko Orisaku Photo Exhibition, Tokyu Department Store (courtesy of Embassy of the Republic of Hungary in Japan)
 2019 • "Francis Haar: Disappearing Honolulu". John Young Museum of Art, the University of Hawai‘i at Mānoa

Documentary films
 1948 • Hamajo Fishing Village, Palmer Pictures
 1950 • Picturesque Japan, Japan Travel Bureau 
 1951 • Students Today – Japan's Tomorrow , Australian Mission, Tokyo
 1953 • Arts of Japan, U.S. Information Agency, Tokyo
 1954 • Awakening, Sophia University, Tokyo
 1955 • Japanese Calligraphy, Belgian Education Ministry
 1959 • Ukiyoe – Prints of Japan, Art Institute of Chicago
 1959 • Juvenile Delinquency in Chicago, Chicago Public Television
 1961 • Hula Ho'olaulea – Traditional Dances of Hawai'i, Honolulu Academy of Arts
 1962 • Pineapple Country Hawai'i, Pineapple Growers Association, Honolulu
 1963 • The Other Language, AID Far East Training Center, Hawai'i
 1964 • Tenno – Symbol and Myth, Asuka Production with Fuji Television Company, Tokyo
 1966 • Hawaii's Asian Heritage', Island Films Production, Honolulu
 1968 • Aala – Life and Death of a Community, B.B.H. Productions, Honolulu
 1976 • Artists of Hawai'i'', Bicentennial Commission and Hawai'i State Foundation on Culture and the Arts, Honolulu

Works in public collections
 Victoria and Albert Museum, London
 Museum of Modern Art, New York
 Hawai'i State Foundation on Culture and the Arts
 Mayor's Office of Culture and the Arts, Honolulu
 The Contemporary Museum, Honolulu
 Hungarian Museum of Photography, Kecskemét

Photographers from Budapest
1908 births
1997 deaths
Photography in Japan
University of Hawaiʻi faculty
Hungarian emigrants to the United States